Curtis Johnson (born December 24, 1973) is a retired American sprinter.

He competed in the 100 metres at the 1992 World Junior Championships, the 2000 Summer Olympics and the 2001 World Championships without reaching the final. At the 1992 World Junior Championships he won a silver medal in the 4 x 100 metres relay.

His personal best times were 6.70 seconds in the 60 metres, achieved in February 2001 in New York; 10.07 seconds in the 100 metres, achieved in July 2000 in Sacramento; and 20.77 seconds in the 200 metres, achieved in August 1999 in Monaco.

Johnson was born in Palmetto, Florida.

References

External links

1973 births
Living people
American male sprinters
Olympic track and field athletes of the United States
Athletes (track and field) at the 2000 Summer Olympics
World Athletics Championships athletes for the United States
People from Palmetto, Florida
Sportspeople from Bradenton, Florida